The Diving competition in the 1973 Summer Universiade in Moscow, Soviet Union.

Medal overview

Medal table

References
 

1973 Summer Universiade
1973
Diving in the Soviet Union
1973 in diving